Third rail railways predominantly operates in urban areas. Notable exceptions are (or were) mainline electrics of the former Southern Region of British Railways and a few interurban railways in the US. In Europe top contact third rail tends to be limited to early electrified urban railways (the current conductor is normally left naked on top), contrary to North America where it usually has a protecting cover. Considered safe, the covered top contact conductor also appeared at most North American systems built relatively recently. Modern European systems predominantly make use of bottom or side contact power rails.

There are numerous urban rail systems, including these running mostly in tunnels, which do not use third rail at all. Such systems can be found in Asia, which may have been influenced by the overhead power supply formula followed by Tokyo Metro after 1960. All South Korean systems use overhead wires (or rigid conductors), as do most modern mainland Chinese metros. In Europe all significant Spanish systems now have overhead power supply. Modern Latin America urban rail also uses overhead wires, though with some important exceptions.

Special group of bottom power supplied railways are rubber-tyred systems. In fact, it may be difficult to classify them beyond any doubt. They may be trains but are they still railways? And do they still have 'third' rails? Despite doubts, such guided systems have been included in the list below.

The list does not include conduit system trams (trolleys), once quite popular in some countries, but none survive.

Europe

United Kingdom

Former:

 Giant's Causeway Tramway (elevated third rail; later replaced by overhead wire)
 Bessbrook and Newry Tramway (t/c)
 Liverpool Overhead Railway (t/c)
 Manchester Victoria - Bury (by the Lancashire and Yorkshire Railway) (side contact)
 Tyneside Electrics (t/c)
Switzerland
Former:
 Chemin de fer Fribourg–Morat–Anet (1903–1947)

AsiaJapan Sapporo Chikatetsu - Namboku Line: rubber-tyred with central guiding/return rail and a flat power rail (t/c) which is also one of the rollways for the rubber tyres; Tōzai and Tōhō Lines: rubber-tyred with o/h power supply, a flat return rail which is also one of the rollways for the rubber tyres and a central guiding rail
 Nagoya Chikatetsu - Higashiyama, Meijō, Meikō Lines (t/c, covered)
 Osaka Chikatetsu - except Sakaisuji, Nagahori Tsurumi-ryokuchi and Imazatosuji Lines (t/c, covered)
 Kinki Nippon Tetsudō - Keihanna Line (t/c, covered)
 Kita-Osaka Kyuko Railway (t/c, covered)

Former:
 Shin'etsu Line at Usui Pass (Yokokawa-Karuizawa) - mainline system
 Komaki Peachliner (rubber-tyred, but power supply separate from guiding rail; closed in 2006)

Africa

North AmericaUnited States'''

Former:

 World's Columbian Exposition (Chicago, 1893) railway (t/c)
 Pennsylvania Railroad, suburban network New York - New Jersey (t/c, covered)
 Albany & Hudson Railroad (t/c)
 Baltimore Belt Line, Baltimore & Ohio Railroad
 Scioto Valley Traction Co. (Ohio) (t/c?)
 Oneida Railway (NY Central RR)
 Detroit River Tunnel (Detroit - Windsor), Michigan Central Railroad
 Michigan Rly.: Grand Rapids - Kalamazoo and branch lines
 Central California Traction Co. (Sacramento area)
 Sacramento Northern Railway (t/c)
 Laurel Line (Scranton/Wilkes-Barre, PA)
 Aurora Elgin & Chicago Railroad (t/c)
 Key System - on San Francisco–Oakland Bay Bridge (t/c, covered)
 Jacksonville VAL (gr/c)
 Nantasket Beach Branch; Greenbush Line Braintree-Cohasset, suburban New Haven Railroad, (t/c, center of track)

South America

References 

Electric rail transport